Chechło may refer to the following places in Poland:

Chechło, Lesser Poland Voivodeship 
Chechło, Silesian Voivodeship 
Chechło Pierwsze Łódź Voivodeship (First Chechło) 
Chechło Drugie Łódź Voivodeship (Second Chechło)